Syde, often in the past spelt Side, is a small village and civil parish in Gloucestershire, England. It lies in the Cotswolds, near the source of the River Frome, some six miles north west of Cirencester and seven miles east of Painswick.

There is a Church of England parish church called St Mary's.

The principal house is Syde Manor, a listed building which dates from the 16th and 17th centuries, built of stone rubble with a Cotswold stone roof and gables. Some of its mullioned windows have unusual three-centred arches at their heads. The front of the house which has the main entrance was added in the late 18th or early 19th century.

History
The National Gazetteer of Great Britain and Ireland (1868) says of Side (as it spelt the name): 

John Marius Wilson's Imperial Gazetteer of England and Wales (1870-1872) says:

Governance
Because of its small population, Syde has a parish meeting, at which all electors can attend and vote, rather than a parish council. It forms part of the Ermin ward of Cotswold District, which together with Gloucestershire County Council provides all local government services.

The parish is part of the parliamentary constituency of Cotswold, represented in parliament by the Conservative Geoffrey Clifton-Brown.

Notes

Villages in Gloucestershire
Cotswold District